Niels Peter Markussen (6 September 1934 – 11 July 2008) was a Danish competitive sailor and Olympic medalist. He won a silver medal in the Dragon class at the 1968 Summer Olympics in Mexico City, together with Paul Lindemark Jørgensen and Aage Birch.

References

External links
 
 

1934 births
2008 deaths
Danish male sailors (sport)
Olympic sailors of Denmark
Olympic silver medalists for Denmark
Olympic medalists in sailing
Sailors at the 1960 Summer Olympics – Dragon
Sailors at the 1968 Summer Olympics – Dragon
Medalists at the 1968 Summer Olympics